Alternity is a science fiction role-playing game (RPG) published by TSR in 1998. Following the acquisition of TSR by Wizards of the Coast, the game was discontinued in 2000 as part of a broader rationalisation of TSR's business holdings, but it retains a small and devoted fanbase. Parts of Alternity as well as TSR's classic Star Frontiers game have been incorporated into the d20 Modern game, especially the d20 Future setting. The first campaign setting for the Alternity game, the Star*Drive setting, was introduced in 1998.

A new game called Alternity was crowdfunded on Kickstarter in June 2018 by Sasquatch Game Studio but it ultimately failed to get published.

System
Characters were created with a point-based system, and could be either humans, mutants, one of several alien species presented in the core books, or original aliens created by the GM. Classes were replaced by professions, which dictated what skills and abilities were cheaper for any given hero to get, though a few skills (in particular, psionics) were restricted to specific professions.

Skills are classified into broad and speciality skills. Earning a specialty skill requires an associated broad skill, which requires a character to have sufficient associated ability points. Special skill is further classified into ranks, which affects the skill's scores. Skill scores are presented with the full score, half that score, and one-quarter that score. which represent the numbers needed to achieve Ordinary, Good, or Amazing successes in an action round respectively.

Unlike many other systems, actions are determined by a control die and situation
dice. When Gamemaster calls for a roll, player rolls 1 control die and 1 situation die. The control die is always a 20-sided die, while situation die can be a 0, 4, 6, 8, 12, 20-sided die, where 0-sided die means the action only depends on control die roll. Situation die can be plus die or a minus die, in which the value in the situation die is added to or subtracted from control die value. The total of the rolled numbers is checked against character's action, skill, feat, to indicate a success or a failure. Rolling low is always better for successfully completing an action.

The type of situation die being used depends on the difficulty of the action. Difficulty is scaled in die types of -d20, -d12, -d8, -d6, -d4, +d0, +d4, +d6, +d8, +d12, +d20, +2d20, +3d20. A character's base situation die is +d4 for broad skill or feat check, +d0 for specialty skill or action check. A minus situation bonus means player uses a larger negative situation die set, while a plus situation penalty means a player uses a larger positive situation die set.

In an action round, a round is divided into 4 phases. Each phase relates to one of the degrees of success that are achievable on an action check: Amazing, Good, Ordinary, and Marginal, in order from the first phase to the last. A hero can attempt only 1 action per phase. Acting orders of characters are determined by a d20 die roll for all participants, which determines the earliest phase in which a character can act. All actions in a phase are considered to occur simultaneously, with the results of those actions being applied at the end of the phase. A character can act in as many phases as it has actions per round.

Depending on how far below the skill score the player rolled, there are 3 progressively better layers of success and 2 levels of failure. An action is determined using this same system, making the game very uniform. Only armor rolls and damage rolls did not use the d20.

Life points, called 'Durability', are categorized into Stun, Wound, and Mortal damage. Stun damage can immobilize a character, but are not life-threatening. They are restored at the end of a scene. Wound damage can immobilize a character and inflicts 1 stun damage point for every 2 wound damage points received. It can be recovered by resting. Mortal damage can kill a character, and inflicts 1 wound damage point for every 2 mortal damage points received. It can be restored by use of the Medical Science–surgery skill. Durabilities can also be repaired by healing.

It was designed to be a generic rule set around which a campaign world could be built. It was not very heavily marketed and suffered from mediocre sales. Increased focus on the d20 system led to the discontinuation of the game in 2000.

Much of the content of the Alternity game has been absorbed into the d20 Modern role-playing game. The Dark•Matter campaign is an entire d20 Modern expansion and Star*Drive is part of the d20 Future expansion. The Gamma World campaign is an d20 Modern expansion by Sword & Sorcery Studios (White Wolf).

Dice mechanics
Alternity uses four, six, eight, twelve, and twenty-sided dice. It does not use the popular ten-sided die, perhaps to help distinguish it from the competing World of Darkness and the Trinity role-playing game, published by White Wolf Game Studio.

The probability curve created by the addition or subtraction of a d20 and another die is shaped like a plateau, with two straight lines on both ends of the flat region. This is intermediate between the totally flat probability curve rolled by rolling a 20-sided die and the bell-shaped curve produced by die pool systems.

Published products
Several books were published under the Alternity banner as core products, accessories, or under specific campaign settings.

Core products
These products presented the basic rules and information about the Alternity system.
 Introductory Box Set – A box set including all the basic information for players and gamemasters to learn the Alternity rules.
 Player's Handbook – Included all the rules for players and player characters. Required to play.
 Gamemaster Guide – Included all the rules for gamemasters and session preparation. Required to play.
 Fast Play – An abbreviated form of the rules to ease players into the game.
 Campaign Kit – The kit included a gamemaster's screen and a booklet of record keeping forms.

Accessories
These products were not tied to any of the official campaign settings but could be used with them.
 Beyond Science: A Guide to FX – An exploration and reworking of the FX abilities (a sci-fi version of magic) in the corebook.
 Dataware – The guide to computers, hacking, and robotics.
 Mindwalking – The guide to psionics including revisions to the rules from the corebook.
 Starships – The guide to interstellar ships and travel.
 Tangents – This book explored the concept of parallel realities in the same vein as the 90s television show Sliders.

Campaign settings
In addition to the general Alternity line of products, four campaign settings were published, each with their own books:
 Star*Drive – A space opera setting.
 Dark•Matter – A setting similar to The X-Files television show.
 Gamma World – An update to the classic post-apocalyptic game setting.
 StarCraft Adventures – Based on the popular computer strategy game by Blizzard Entertainment.  This setting used simplified "fast play" rules rather than the full Alternity rule set.

References

Further reading

External links
The official Alternity fansite

 
Role-playing game systems
Role-playing games introduced in 1998